Po poyas v nebe is the fourth studio album by Nikolai Noskov, released in 2006 in Russia. The presentation of the album took place on March 11, 2006 in the Kremlin Palace.

Noskov was inspired to write the album during his travels in India.

Album information and production 
All music written by Nikolai Noskov unless otherwise stated.

Track listing

References

External links

Nikolai Noskov albums
2006 albums
Russian-language albums